The Fort Laramie Treaty of 1851 was signed on September 17, 1851 between United States treaty commissioners and representatives of the Cheyenne, Sioux, Arapaho, Crow, Assiniboine, Mandan, Hidatsa, and Arikara Nations. Also known as Horse Creek Treaty, the treaty set forth traditional territorial claims of the tribes.

The United States acknowledged that all the land covered by the treaty was Indian territory and did not claim any part of it. The boundaries agreed to in the Fort Laramie Treaty of 1851 would be used to settle a number of claims cases in the 20th century. The Native Americans guaranteed safe passage for settlers on the Oregon Trail and allowed roads and forts to be built in their territories, in exchange for promises of an annuity in the amount of fifty thousand dollars for fifty years. The treaty also sought to "make an effective and lasting peace" among the eight tribes, who were often at odds with each other.

Background
Although many European and European-American migrants to western North America had previously passed through the Great Plains on the Oregon and Santa Fe Trails, the California gold rush beginning in 1848 greatly increased traffic. The next year, both Thomas Fitzpatrick (agent of Upper Platte and Arkansas) and David D. Mitchell (superintendent at Saint Louis) recommended a council with the tribes to prevent a conflict. The United States government undertook negotiations with the Plains Tribes living between the Arkansas and Missouri rivers to ensure protected right-of-way for the migrants. The Congress had appropriated one hundred thousand dollars to the assembly, endorsed by Luke Lea (the Commissioner of Indian Affairs).

The treaty was negotiated and signed at the mouth of Horse Creek,  downriver from Fort Laramie, because the area around Fort Laramie lacked food for the horses. Many natives have referred to the treaty as the Horse Creek Treaty. Representatives from the Lakota Sioux (Red Fish, Lone Horn), Cheyenne, Assiniboine, Gros Ventre, Mandan, Arikara, Hidatsa, Shoshone, Crow (Big Robber, Sits-on-Edge-of Fortification), and Arapaho took part in the treaty discussions.

The United States Senate ratified the treaty, adding Article 5 which adjusted compensation from fifty to ten years. All tribes, with the exception of the Crow, accepted. Several tribes never received the commodities promised as payments.

The Treaty Territory 

The Lakota Sioux received exclusive treaty rights to the Black Hills (present South Dakota), to the consternation of the Cheyenne and the Arapaho. "... the Sioux were given rights to the Black Hills and other country that the Northern Cheyennes claimed. Their home country was the Black Hills," declared a Cheyenne historian in 1967. Arapaho chief Black Coal complained in 1875: "I have never got anything yet for my land [the Black Hills]. It is part mine, and part the Sioux... In the first place, they came from the Missouri River and reached this place, and now they have got up this far, and they claim all this land."

The Cheyenne and Arapaho, the southernmost of the treaty tribes, held an area southward of the North Platte in common (mainly in present Wyoming and Colorado).

The Crow treaty territory (in present Montana and Wyoming) included the area westward from Powder River. Little Bighorn River ran through the center of the Crow domain.

After the Treaty 

The treaty was broken almost immediately after its inception. In 1858, during the Pike's Peak Gold Rush, a mass immigration of miners and settlers into Colorado occurred. White settlers took over the treaty's established territories in order to mine them, "against the protests of the Indians." These settlers established towns, farms, and improved roadways. Before 1861, the Cheyenne and Arapaho "had been driven from the mountain regions down upon the waters of the Arkansas." Such immigrants competed with the tribes for game and water, straining limited resources and causing conflicts. The U.S. government did not enforce the treaty to keep out the immigrants. In 1864, Colonel John M. Chivington's armies perpetrated the Sand Creek massacre against a camp of mostly Cheyennes. This event led to years of war between the Cheyennes and the United States.

The situation escalated in 1854 with the Grattan affair, when a detachment of U.S. soldiers illegally entered a Sioux encampment to arrest those accused of stealing a cow, and in the process sparked a battle in which Chief Conquering Bear was killed.

Though intertribal fighting had existed before the arrival of white settlers, some of the post-treaty intertribal fighting can be attributed to targeted mass killings of bison by white settlers and government agents. The U.S. Army did not enforce treaty regulations and allowed hunters onto Native land to slaughter buffalo, providing protection and sometimes ammunition. One hundred thousand buffalo were killed each year until they were on the verge of extinction, which threatened the tribes' subsistence. These mass killings affected all tribes thus the tribes were forced onto each other's hunting grounds, where fighting broke out.

By summer 1862, all three tribes had been forced out of their shared treaty territory. "We, the Arikara, have been driven from our country on the other side of the Missouri River by the Sioux", stated chief White Shield in 1864. The elimination of buffalo also meant that the Yanktonai Sioux moved into Assiniboine hunting grounds in North Dakota and Montana, where the Assiniboine made peace with them.

Before long, the Crows saw their western Powder River area flooded with trespassing Lakotas in search of bison, and "... large scale battles with invading Sioux" took place near present-day city of Wyola, Montana. The outnumbered Crows were displaced little by little. "The country from the Powder River to the Yellowstone River was their country [the Crows'], until 1859, when they were driven from it by the Sioux". In 1868, after a series of battles with the United States army in the contested area, the Lakotas finally succeeded in turning a part of the Crow Indian territory of 1851 into unceded Indian territory of their own.

Later again, huge parts of the different Indian territories would in one way or another be added to the holdings of the United States. Smaller areas of the initial Indian territories became separate reservations, usually populated with Indians from the tribe, which held the treaty right in 1851.

The Crow territory outlined in the treaty was split to provide land to two different reservations. The Crow Reservation was created in the center of the original territory in 1868. The reservation of the Northern Cheyennes was designated in 1884. It is located entirely within the boundaries of the 1851 Crow territory, after the Indians in question had "earned the right to stay in the north" after the Fort Robinson outbreak.

The Arapahoe (Northern Arapaho) settled down on the reservation of their past enemies, the Shoshone, in present Wind River Reservation in Wyoming. The Southern Cheyenne and the Arapaho live in a common reservation in present Oklahoma, also far from their 1851 treaty land.

The Assiniboine in the United States has since 1888 lived in partly Fort Peck Reservation and partly Fort Belknap Reservation, both placed north of the Missouri in present Montana. The treaty territory of the Assiniboine south of the Missouri was just a small portion of the wide range used by these northern plains Indians.

See also 
Indian Peace Commission, which would negotiate the second Treaty of Fort Laramie

References

External links
 "Treaty of Fort Laramie with Sioux, Etc., 1851." 11 StatsAffairs: Laws and Treaties — Vol. II: Treaties.'' Washington, D.C.: Government Printing Office, 1904, pp. 594–596. Through Oklahoma State University Library, Electronic Publishing Center.
Map of North America following the 1851 Treaty of Fort Laramie at omniatlas.com
National Park Service, Treaties and Broken Promises, retrieved November 23, 2016

Fort Laramie
Sioux Wars
1851 treaties